United States gubernatorial elections were held on November 3, 1981, in two states and one territory.  Both seats were open due to term limits, and both also switched parties, resulting in zero net change for both parties.

Election results

References

 
November 1981 events in the United States